The Nautch Girl, or, The Rajah of Chutneypore is a comic opera in two acts, with a book by George Dance, lyrics by Dance and Frank Desprez and music by Edward Solomon.  It opened on 30 June 1891 at the Savoy Theatre managed by Richard D'Oyly Carte and ran until 16 January 1892, for a respectable 200 performances, and then toured the British provinces and colonies.  

The cast included several players familiar to the Savoy's audiences: Courtice Pounds (Indru), Frank Thornton (Pyjama), W. H. Denny (Bumbo), Frank Wyatt (Baboo Currie) and Rutland Barrington (Punka, replaced by W. S. Penley, when Barrington left the company for several months to tour in a series of "musical duologues" with Jessie Bond).  The part of Chinna Loofa was the last role that Jessie Bond created at the Savoy.  She wrote in her memoirs that it was one of her favourites.  The title role was played by Lenore Snyder, the last of a number of actresses who had played Gianetta in The Gondoliers.

The opera was absent from the professional stage throughout the twentieth century but has been revived occasionally by amateur companies. The opera received its only known North American performances on 7 and 8 August 2004, by the Royal English Opera Company of Rockford, Illinois.

Background

When the Gilbert and Sullivan partnership disbanded after the production of The Gondoliers in 1889, impresario Richard D'Oyly Carte was forced to find new works to present at the Savoy Theatre.  This was the first non-Gilbert and Sullivan "Savoy Opera", but it was designed to resemble its G&S predecessors, in particular The Mikado, with its exotic oriental setting. The Times review of 1 July 1891 noted: 
Both Mr. George Dance and Mr. Edward Solomon have ... subordinated their own individualities to the traditions of the theatre, and have produced a work which, if brought out anonymously, would be unhesitatingly classed, by superficial observers at all events, among the rest of the "Gilbert and Sullivan" operas. It may, indeed, be doubted whether the older collaborators would have followed their own example so closely as their successors have done.

Carte knew Solomon well, and he had presented Solomon's 1881 comic opera, Claude Duval, on tour in 1882.  In 1893, Solomon's Billee Taylor (originally produced in 1880), also joined the D'Oyly Carte repertoire.  Desprez had written several curtain raisers for the Savoy during the 1880s. Dance was the younger collaborator, and later he was responsible for the phenomenally successful musical A Chinese Honeymoon, which ran for more than a thousand performances at the turn of the century. Nellie Stewart was originally cast as Hollee Beebee, the title character, but she "resigned" the role a month before the show opened.

Synopsis
Punka, the rajah of Chutneypore, is soft-hearted.  His life is beset by many problems, including the love of his son, Indru, for the nautch dancer Hollee Beebee; Punka's sponging relatives, especially the scheming Vizier Pyjama; and a missing diamond that serves as the national idol's right eye.  Indru is a Brahmin, a high caste, and Beebee, who used to be a Brahmin, is of a low caste due to a legal decision that is being appealed.  Therefore, they cannot marry.  Indru renounces his caste (by eating cow meat) and his royal position to become Beebee's equal, so they can marry.  Punka chastises Beebee for seeking the love of one whose caste is above hers.  Punka also notes that his meddling relative, Pyjama, stole the idol's eye and then lost it, but that he cannot harm his relative.  Just then, Pyjama announces with great amusement that Beebee has won the court appeal and is now a Brahmin; and so now she is a Brahmin, but Indru is not.  The law condemns both a Brahmin and his or her lower caste spouse to a traitor's death.  Beebee escapes to Europe with the dance troupe, but when Indru tries to join the girls, he is imprisoned under threat of execution. 

Pyjama, scheming to become the rajah, has put an anonymous letter on the idol's shrine informing Punka that Indru is a condemned man.  The father of a condemned man may not be rajah.  Chinna Loofah, a woman seeking a husband, has an affection for Indru (and nearly every other man), and she breaks him out of jail.  Indru hides as a miracle is announced: Bumbo, the two-thousand-year-old idol, has stepped down from his place.  Bumbo is looking for his diamond eye and the villain who stole it.  He complains about the neglect of his worship and dismisses Punka as rajah (and condemns him and all his relations to death by crocodile), replacing him with Pyjama (although, being kin, Pyjama also would be condemned).  However, Bumbo spots Chinna, and they very soon find themselves discussing marriage.  

Beebee returns from a personally triumphant European tour, carrying a curious gem on her necklace that had been left for her at a stage door by an admirer, and looks for her Indru.  Pyjama claims that he is exempt from the family execution, saying that he is not a relation of Punka's; he had merely claimed to be in order to get promotion.  Beebee and her girlfriends divert Pyjama with one of their dance numbers so that he is late for the executions, angering Bumbo.  Punka announces that Pyjama is the thief who stole the idol's diamond eye.  As Pyjama is dragged away to his fate, Beebee and Chinna beg for mercy.  Bumbo sees the twinkling diamond around Beebee's neck – it is Bumbo's lost eye.  Punka and Indru are restored to their former positions, and Indru and Beebee can fall into each other's arms.  The idol climbs back onto his shelf with Chinna turned to wood alongside him, and all ends happily (except for Pyjama).

Roles

Musical numbers
Act I
 Beneath the Sky of Blue – Opening Chorus (Pariahs)
 Bow Not, Good People (Indru)
 The Sun Was Setting (Indru and Pariahs)
 Roses are Fair (Indru, Baboo Currie and Pariahs)
 With Merry Song (Banyan, Tiffin, Kalee and Nautch Girls)
 One, Two, Three (Hollee Beebee and Nautch Girls)
 When Our Shackles Are Undone (Beebee, Indru)
 The Rajah of Chutneypore (Punka and Chorus)
 Quite Another Different Kind of Person Altogether (Punka, Beebee, Pyjama, Chinna)
 Do Not Think Me Overbold (Chinna and Punka)
 Merrily, Merrily Ring the Bells (Chorus)
 Beebee's a Bride (Indru, Beebee, Chorus)
 What is caste to you and me? (Indru, Beebee and Ensemble)

Act II
 Entr'acte
 We Are Punka's Poor Relations (Chinna, Cheetah, Suttee and relations)
 The Secret of My Past Success (Pyjama and relations)
 Duet: A Little Caged Bird (Chinna, Indru)
 Bow Ye People (Chorus)
 As I Sat on My Shelf (Bumbo and Chorus)
 When a Fashionable Tenor (Bumbo and Chorus)
 Hymn to Bumbo (Chorus)
 Vive la Liberté (Bumbo, Chinna)
 Crocodile (Punka, Bumbo and Chinna)
 Near thee Once More (Beebee)
 When All the World Was Bright, Love (Indru and Beebee)
 If We Travel by Way of Brindisi (Baboo Currie, Beebee, Banyan, Tiffin, Kalee, Indru and Punka)
 Gently bear my lady to her chamber (Beebee, Banyan, Tiffin, Kalee, Currie, Pyjama and Chorus)
 Finale (Ensemble)

Critical response
The reviews were generally favourable.  The Daily News gave the show a good review, though noting that Solomon did not aspire to Sullivan's "refined melodic inspiration and delicately-finished orchestration", and commenting on a certain monotony in the score caused by an excess of drawing room songs and waltzes. The Pall Mall Gazette considered Dance and Desprez sensible to have modelled their work on that of W.S. Gilbert, and praised Solomon's score for its tunes and for the extravagant orchestration. The Morning Post was not greatly impressed by the score, and referred the opera's "ghastly attempt at humour", but praised the staging and the cast. The Era considered that Carte and his authors and composer had done well to present the Savoy audience with a piece in the familiar Savoy genre without direct imitation of Gilbert and Sullivan. The paper praised the music and libretto, but reserved its highest praise for Carte's production, which "surpassed all previous effects at the Savoy."  The review concluded, If The Nautch Girl is less striking and original than some of its predecessors at the Savoy it has merits of its own which the public are not likely to ignore."  The least favourable critique was that of George Bernard Shaw, in The World:
Nothing in The Nautch Girl sustains the orchestral traditions of comic opera – the delicacy and humor of Auber, the inimitable effervescence of Offenbach, or the musicianly smoothness and charm of Sullivan and Cellier. …  All this may seem rather hard on poor Mr Solomon, the composer upon whom Mr Carte's choice has actually fallen.  But then Mr. Solomon has been very hard on me.  He has given me the worst headache I ever had in a theatre by an instrumental score which is more wearisome than the conversation of an inveterate punster, and more noisy than the melodrame which accompanies the knockabout business in a music hall. …  Of the opera as an artistic whole I cannot very well speak, because it hardly is an artistic whole.  The book was evidently selected for the sake of its resemblance to The Mikado, of which it might almost be called a paraphrase … the utmost that can be said for The Nautch Girl amounts to no more than can be said for any piece at the Lyric or the Prince of Wales.  In other words, the Savoy has lost its speciality.  This, I think, is a misfortune; and if Mr. Carte wishes to remedy it, and cannot discover two new geniuses, he had better make up his mind at once to give a commission to Mr. Grundy for his next libretto, and to Mr. Stanford or Mr. Cowen for his next score.

Notes

References
  
Shaw, Bernard, ed. Dan H. Laurence. Shaw's Music: The Complete Musical Criticism of Bernard Shaw, Max Reinhardt, London, 1981. Volume 1, ; Volume 2, 
Information about The Nautch Girl with links to the libretto, Midi files, score, etc.
Plot of The Nautch Girl

External links
Programme from the original production
Photographs from a 1901 production

English-language operas
English comic operas
Operas by Edward Solomon
Operas
1891 operas
Libretti by Frank Desprez